The Graduate Theological Union (GTU) is a consortium of eight private independent American theological schools and eleven centers and affiliates. Seven of the theological schools are located in Berkeley, California. The GTU was founded in 1962 and their students can take courses at the University of California, Berkeley. Additionally, some of the GTU consortial schools are part of other California universities such as Santa Clara University (Jesuit School of Theology) and California Lutheran University (Pacific Lutheran Theological Seminary). Most of the GTU consortial schools are located in Berkeley area with the majority north of the campus in a neighborhood known as "Holy Hill" due to the cluster of GTU seminaries and centers located there.

History and administration
Many of the GTU's constituent seminaries were established at various locations throughout the Bay Area in the early 20th or even the late 19th centuries. Because of the foundation of the University of California, several of them relocated to Berkeley and established cooperative relationships with the university. In the wake of the formation of the World Council of Churches and the Second Vatican Council, Bay Area seminaries began negotiations to form a cooperative degree program. In 1962, agreement between the Berkeley Baptist Divinity School (now Berkeley School of Theology), Episcopalian Church Divinity School of the Pacific, Pacific Lutheran Theological Seminary and San Francisco Theological Seminary enabled for the incorporation of the Graduate Theological Union in 1962. In 1964, the Pacific School of Religion, St. Albert's College (now the Dominican School of Philosophy and Theology) and Starr King School for the Ministry joined the GTU consortium. In 1966, Alma College relocated to Berkeley and was renamed the Jesuit School of Theology at Berkeley. In 1968, the Franciscan School of Theology moved to Berkeley from Santa Barbara and joined the GTU consortium, although in 2013 it merged with the University of San Diego, leaving the consortium and relocating to Oceanside, California. By 1971, the GTU was fully accredited by the Association of Theological Schools.

In 1969, the GTU common library was established and the individual libraries of the seminaries were merged into one collection. In the 1970s, construction began on a Louis I. Kahn-designed building to house the GTU library. The main library building was completed in 1987 and was named the Flora Lamson Hewlett Library in honor of the Hewlett Foundation.

Presidents and academic deans

Presidents
 John Dillenberger (1967–1971)
 Claude Welch (1971–1982)
 Michael Blecker (1982–1987)
 Robert Barr (1987–1992)
 Glenn R. Bucher (1992–1999)
 James Donahue (2000–2012)
 Riess Potterveld (2013–2018)
 Daniel Lehmann (2018–2020)
 Uriah Kim (2020—present)

Academic deans
 Sherman E. Johnson (1962–1963)
 John Dillenberger (1963–1971)
 Claude Welch (1971–1987)
 Judith Berling (1987–1996; interim, 2016)
 Margaret Miles (1996–2001)
 Arthur Holder (2001–2016)
 Uriah Y. Kim (2017–2020)
 Elizabeth S. Pena (interim, 2020-2022)
 Jennifer Davidson (2022–present)

The dean of the GTU is the chief academic officer. The dean also chairs the GTU's council of deans, which is composed of the academic deans of the member schools. Traditionally, deans have held the John Dillenberger Professorship in their general field of specialization. The fifth dean, Margaret Miles, was the John Dillenberger Professor of Historical Theology while the sixth dean, Arthur Holder, was the John Dillenberger Professor of Christian Spirituality. The current dean, Uriah Y. Kim, is the John Dillenberger Professor of Biblical Studies.

Member seminaries, academic centers, and affiliates

Consortial seminaries 
 Berkeley School of Theology (American Baptist Churches USA)
 Church Divinity School of the Pacific (Episcopal)
 Dominican School of Philosophy and Theology
 Institute of Buddhist Studies
 Jesuit School of Theology of Santa Clara University
 Pacific Lutheran Theological Seminary (ELCA)
 Pacific School of Religion (United Church of Christ, Disciples of Christ, and United Methodist Church)
 San Francisco Theological Seminary (Presbyterian Church (USA))
 Starr King School for the Ministry (Unitarian Universalist)

Academic centers and Affiliates 
 Center for the Arts and Religion
 Center for Islamic Studies
 Center for Swedenborgian Studies
 Center for Theology and the Natural Sciences
 Mira & Ajay Shingal Center for Dharma Studies
 New College Berkeley
 Patriarch Athenagoras Orthodox Institute
 Richard S. Dinner Center for Jewish Studies
 Newbigin House of Studies
 Wilmette Institute

Academics
The GTU offers the Doctor of Philosophy (Ph.D.) degree and the Master of Arts (MA) degree in cooperation with its member seminaries. GTU consortial seminaries variously offer Th.M., M.Div., Doctor of Ministry (D.Min.), S.T.B., S.T.L., and S.T.D. degrees. The GTU also offers non-degree certificates in Interreligious Chaplaincy and Interreligious Studies. Ph.D. students are encouraged not only to take advantage of the academic resources available to them at the University of California at Berkeley, but are required to include a non-GTU scholar in their exams or dissertation committees. As such, students have collaborated with UC-B faculty members in the anthropology, critical theory, ethnic studies, history, philosophy, sociology, etc. departments.

Departments and certificate programs
There are four doctoral departments, with more than 30 concentrations, encompassing the breadth of religious and theological scholarship at the GTU. The Sacred Texts and Interpretation department focuses on Hebrew Bible, New Testament, Rabbinic Literature, and studies in the sacred texts of Islamic and Hindu traditions. Historical and Cultural Studies of Religions encompasses studies in history of religions, art and religion, interreligious studies, and sociology of religion. Theology and Ethics focuses on theological and ethical reflections in the Christian, Jewish, Islamic, and Hindu traditions. Other concentrations include comparative theology/ethics, philosophical theology, theology and science, and aesthetics. Religion and Practice focuses on homiletics, liturgical studies, missiology, practical theology, and religious education. The GTU also offers certificates in specialized studies.

All degree seeking students at GTU may take any classes offered at the University of California, Berkeley, and have access and borrowing privileges at the University of California, Berkeley and Stanford University libraries. Only Ph.D. students have unrestricted access to registering for UCB classes (subject to approval of course instructors). Cross-registration opportunities are also available at Dominican University of California, Holy Names University, and Mills College. Additionally, students can participate in international exchange programs.

Berkeley Journal of Religion and Theology
The GTU's in-house academic journal is the Berkeley Journal of Religion and Theology. The journal is managed by current doctoral students, although peer-reviewers include members of the consortial doctoral faculty. All issues are available free online.

Campus
Although the GTU consortium occupies many buildings throughout the Bay Area, only three buildings are owned by the GTU. The largest of the buildings is the Flora Lamson Hewlett Library, one of the largest theological libraries in the world, with around 529,000 volumes.

Notable alumni
 David Batstone, Professor of business ethics at the University of San Francisco
 Virginia Burrus, Bishop W. Earl Ledden Professor of Religion at Syracuse University
 James Donahue, President of Saint Mary's College of California and 6th president of the GTU.
 Eileen Chamberlain Donahoe, U.S. Ambassador to the United Nations Human Rights Council
Heup Young Kim, President of the Korea Forum for Science and Life, Korean Society of Systematic Theology, and Honorary Professor of Theology at Kangnam University.
 Kristin Johnston Largen, President of Wartburg Theological Seminary
 Nancey Murphy, Professor of Christian philosophy at Fuller Theological Seminary
 Mark L. Poorman, President of the University of Portland.
 Robert John Russell, Ian Barbour Professor of Theology at the Graduate Theological Union and Director of the Center for Theology and the Natural Sciences.
 Gregory Sterling, Dean of Yale Divinity School and The Reverend Henry L. Slack Dean and Lillian Claus Professor of New Testament at Yale University
 George Tinker, Clifford Baldridge Professor of American Indian Cultures and Religious Traditions at Iliff School of Theology
 Shibley Telhami, Anwar Sadat Professor for Peace and Development at the University of Maryland
 Wesley Wildman, Professor of Philosophy, Theology, and Ethics and Founding Member of Faculty of Computing and Data Sciences at Boston University
 Laurie Zoloth, Margaret E. Burton Professor at the University of Chicago Divinity School and former president of the American Academy of Religion.
 Hamza Yusuf, Co-founder of Zaytuna College.
Douglas E. Oakman, Professor of New Testament at Pacific Lutheran University.

Faculty
The GTU draws its consortial faculty from its constituent seminaries and centers. Although faculty members are employed at their respective seminaries and centers, they commit to supervising doctoral and masters students, as well as occasionally teaching advanced GTU-wide courses.

Notable current faculty
 Christopher Ocker, Professor of Church History at San Francisco Theological Seminary and affiliate Professor of History at University of California, Berkeley.
 Ted Peters, Distinguished Research Professor of Systematic Theology at Pacific Lutheran Theological Seminary and Affiliate Professor at the Ayala Center for Theology and Natural Sciences.
Robert John Russell, Ian Barbour Professor of Theology and Science and Director of the Ayala Center for Theology and Science.

Notable former faculty
Former faculty members include Naomi Seidman, Daniel C. Matt, David Alexander, John Dillenberger, and Roy I. Sano.

References

External links
 Official website

 
Education in Berkeley, California
Seminaries and theological colleges in California
Universities and colleges in Alameda County, California
Universities and colleges in Marin County, California
Schools accredited by the Western Association of Schools and Colleges
Educational institutions established in 1962
Christian seminaries and theological colleges
1962 establishments in California